Christos Batzios (born 15 October 1991) is a Greek professional footballer who plays as a centre-back for Super League 2 club Chania.

Career
Born in Kavala, Batzios began his football career at the infrastructure segments of local club, Elpides Kavala, at the age of 7. At the age of 16, he signed up with fellow local club Aris Zygos, where he stayed until he graduated from high school. Having been accepted in the Department of Primary Education at the Democritus University of Thrace, Batzios combined his studies with amateur football, playing for Alexandroupoli-based clubs Ethnikos and Nea Chili, as well as neighboring club Evros Soufli. After graduating, Batzios returned to his hometown and signed a contract with Kavala in the summer of 2014. He, and teammate Alexandros Bracjani refused to sign a new contract with the club during the winter transfer window of the 2016–17 Gamma Ethniki season and subsequently signed with Cretan Gamma Ethniki club Ergotelis in January 2017.

After winning the Division title with Ergotelis at the end of the season, Batzios was one of just five players remaining with the club's roster during an uncertain transitional period, wherein the club was taken over by a new administration. Then the oldest member of the club at age 25, he was appointed team captain by his teammates, a position he kept during his years with the team. He is currently In the 10th place in the history of Ergotelis in terms of appearances, after having reached 128 appearances.

For the season of 2021-2022, Batzios was transferred to Xanthi FC, where he remained until the end of the season. His latest transfer was to the Cretan team Chania FC in August 2022, where he currently plays.

Career statistics

References

External links

1991 births
Living people
Greek footballers
Football League (Greece) players
Super League Greece 2 players
Kavala F.C. players
Ergotelis F.C. players
Association football defenders
Footballers from Kavala